Sheean may refer to:

People
Diana Forbes-Robertson, also known as Diana Sheean, wife of Vincent Sheean (1915–1987), British writer
Teddy Sheean (1923–1942), sailor in the Royal Australian Navy
Vincent Sheean (1899–1975), American journalist and novelist

Other uses
HMAS Sheean (SSG 77), a Collins-class submarine operated by the Royal Australian Navy
Sheean, Islandeady, a townland in the civil parish of Islandeady, County Mayo, Ireland

See also
Sheahan, a surname
Sheehan, a surname